Volodymyr Lutsenko is a Ukrainian retired footballer.

Career
Volodymyr Lutsenko started playing in 1999 until 2002 for Metalist-2 Kharkiv and Metalist Kharkiv. In summer 2002 he returned to Metalist-2 Kharkiv. In summer 2003 he moved to Desna Chernihiv in Chernihiv where he played 13 matches and scored 2 goals. In January 2004 he moved to Metalist-2 Kharkiv and Hazovyk-HGV. In summer 2004 he moved back to Desna Chernihiv where he played 14 matches and then he moved to Arsenal Kharkiv where he played 12 matches and scored 2 goals. In summer 2006 he moved Stal Kamianske and YPA in Finland.

References

External links 
 Artem Akhrameyev footballfacts.ru
 Artem Artem Akhrameyev allplayers.in.ua

1982 births
Living people
FC Desna Chernihiv players
Ukrainian footballers
Ukrainian Premier League players
Ukrainian First League players
Ukrainian Second League players
Ukrainian expatriate sportspeople in Finland
Expatriate footballers in Finland
Association football defenders